Guglielmo "Mino" Caprio (born 17 November 1955) is an Italian actor and voice actor.

Biography
Caprio is typically known for dubbing voices of celebrities and cartoon characters. He is the official Italian dub voice for celebrities like Seth MacFarlane, Martin Short, and Mark Williams. He is the Italian voice for Arthur Weasley in Harry Potter and Peter Griffin in Family Guy. Caprio is also the current Italian voice of Kermit the Frog, and has voiced the frog in every Muppets movie to date.

In 2012, Caprio had taken over as the Italian voice of Grandpa Simpson in The Simpsons as well as the Italian voice of Professor Farnsworth in Futurama, replacing Mario Milita and Sergio Graziani respectively. He has also dubbed over C-3PO in the Star Wars franchise since 1999.

Filmography
The Big Score (2016)
Shortcut (2020)

Dubbing roles

Animation
Peter Griffin in Family Guy (Season 1 - ongoing)
Kermit the Frog in The Muppet Movie
Kermit the Frog in The Great Muppet Caper
Kermit the Frog (Bob Cratchit) in The Muppet Christmas Carol
Kermit the Frog (Captain Smollett) in Muppet Treasure Island
Kermit the Frog in Muppets From Space
Kermit the Frog in Kermit's Swamp Years
Kermit the Frog in It's a Very Merry Muppet Christmas Movie
Kermit the Frog in The Muppets' Wizard of Oz
Kermit the Frog in The Muppets
Kermit the Frog in Muppets Most Wanted
Pesto in Animaniacs 
Boomhauer in King of the Hill 
Flem in Cow and Chicken 
Moe Syszlak (Season 1-Season 7) / Grampa Simpson (Season 23 and on) in The Simpsons 
Professor Farnsworth in Futurama (seasons 6-7)
Professor Zündapp in Cars 2
Richard Watterson in The Amazing World of Gumball
Tutter in Bear in the Big Blue House
Pleakley in Lilo & Stitch
Pleakley in Stitch! The Movie
Pleakley in Lilo & Stitch 2: Stitch Has a Glitch
Pleakley in Leroy & Stitch
Pleakley in Lilo & Stitch: The Series
Brain in Igor
Principal Purdy in Mr. Peabody & Sherman
Griffin the Invisible Man in Hotel Transylvania
Griffin the Invisible Man in Hotel Transylvania 2
Griffin the Invisible Man in Hotel Transylvania 3: Summer Vacation
Lars in 101 Dalmatians II: Patch's London Adventure
Wheezy in Toy Story 2
Wheezy in Buzz Lightyear of Star Command: The Adventure Begins
C-3PO in Star Wars: Clone Wars
C-3PO in Star Wars: The Clone Wars - The Movie
C-3PO in Star Wars: The Clone Wars
C-3PO in Star Wars Rebels
C-3PO in Star Wars Forces of Destiny
C-3PO in Star Wars Resistance
Marvin the Martian in The Looney Tunes Show
Smokey / Steamer in The Polar Express
Carl Murphy in Monsters vs. Aliens
Larry in The Wild
Merchant in Aladdin
Vinnie Raton in ChalkZone

Live action
Thimbletack in The Spiderwick Chronicles
Jack Frost in The Santa Clause 3: The Escape Clause
Franck Eggelhoffer in Father of the Bride
Franck Eggelhoffer in Father of the Bride Part II
Ned Perry in Three Fugitives
Martin Harvey in Captain Ron
Richard Kempster in Jungle 2 Jungle
Lionel Dillard in Mumford
Rudy Blatnoyd in Inherent Vice
Ted in Ted
Ted in Ted 2
Albert Stark in A Million Ways to Die in the West
Marv Merchants in Home Alone
Marv Merchants in Home Alone 2: Lost in New York
C-3PO in Star Wars: Episode I – The Phantom Menace
C-3PO in Star Wars: Episode II – Attack of the Clones
C-3PO in Star Wars: Episode III – Revenge of the Sith
C-3PO in Star Wars: Episode VII – The Force Awakens
C-3PO in Star Wars: Episode VIII – The Last Jedi
C-3PO in Star Wars: Episode IX – The Rise of Skywalker
C-3PO in Rogue One: A Star Wars Story
Arthur Weasley in Harry Potter and the Philosopher's Stone
Arthur Weasley in Harry Potter and the Chamber of Secrets
Arthur Weasley in Harry Potter and the Prisoner of Azkaban
Arthur Weasley in Harry Potter and the Goblet of Fire
Arthur Weasley in Harry Potter and the Order of the Phoenix
Arthur Weasley in Harry Potter and the Half-Blood Prince
Arthur Weasley in Harry Potter and the Deathly Hallows – Part 1
Arthur Weasley in Harry Potter and the Deathly Hallows – Part 2
Yin Yang in The Expendables
Yin Yang in The Expendables 2
Yin Yang in The Expendables 3
Robert Romano in ER
Rom in Star Trek: Deep Space Nine

References

External links
 
 
 

1955 births
Living people
20th-century Italian male actors
21st-century Italian male actors
Male actors from Rome
Italian male voice actors
Italian male stage actors
Italian voice directors